The Yankee Women's Open was a golf tournament on the LPGA Tour from 1964 to 1967. It was played in Grand Blanc, Michigan at the Atlas Valley Country Club from 1964 to 1966 and at the Willowood Country Club in 1967. It was an unofficial team (best-ball) event in 1966 and 1967.

Winners
Yankee Ladies' Team Championship
1967 Clifford Ann Creed and Margie Masters

Yankee Women's Open
1966 Gloria Ehret and Judy Kimball

Yankee Open
1965 Kathy Whitworth

Yankee Women's Open
1964 Ruth Jessen

References

Former LPGA Tour events
Golf in Michigan
Sports in Flint, Michigan
Recurring sporting events established in 1964
Recurring sporting events disestablished in 1967
1964 establishments in Michigan
1967 disestablishments in Michigan